York Township is one of the fourteen townships of Morgan County, Ohio, United States.  The 2000 census found 958 people in the township.

Geography
Located in the northwestern corner of the county, it borders the following townships:
Clay Township, Muskingum County - north, west of Brush Creek Township
Brush Creek Township, Muskingum County - north, east of Clay Township
Harrison Township, Muskingum County - northeast
Bloom Township - east
Deerfield Township - south
Bearfield Township, Perry County - southwest
Harrison Township, Perry County - west

It is the most westerly township in Morgan County.

No municipalities are located in York Township, although the unincorporated community of Rose Farm lies in the township's southwest.

Name and history
It is one of ten York Townships statewide.

Government
The township is governed by a three-member board of trustees, who are elected in November of odd-numbered years to a four-year term beginning on the following January 1. Two are elected in the year after the presidential election and one is elected in the year before it. There is also an elected township fiscal officer, who serves a four-year term beginning on April 1 of the year after the election, which is held in November of the year before the presidential election. Vacancies in the fiscal officership or on the board of trustees are filled by the remaining trustees.

References

External links
County website
Township officials

Townships in Morgan County, Ohio
Townships in Ohio